Ralf Thienel (29 May 1959 – 1 August 1995) was a West German rower. Together with Christian Händle he finished 4th in the double scull at the 1988 Summer Olympics.

References
 
 

1959 births
1995 deaths
West German male rowers
Rowers at the 1988 Summer Olympics
Olympic rowers of West Germany
World Rowing Championships medalists for West Germany